Mitchell Leidner (born January 17, 1994) is a former American football quarterback. He played college football at Minnesota, and was signed by the Minnesota Vikings as an undrafted free agent.

High School career
Leidner attended Lakeville South High School in Lakeville, Minnesota. He committed to the University of Minnesota to play college football.

College career
Leidner played at Minnesota from 2013 to 2016. He tied a school record for quarterbacks when he ran for four touchdowns in one game in 2013 against San Jose State as a redshirt freshman. After starting four games as a freshman, he took over as the full-time starter in 2014. Leidner was named the MVP of the 2015 Quick Lane Bowl. During his career, he started 41 of 47 games and passed for 7,287 yards, 34 touchdowns and 32 interceptions.

Statistics
Leidner's college statistics are as follows:

Professional career

Leidner signed with the Minnesota Vikings as an undrafted free agent on August 20, 2017. He was waived on September 2, 2017.

References

External links
Minnesota Golden Gophers bio
CBS Sports (Statistics)

1994 births
Living people
Players of American football from Minnesota
American football quarterbacks
Minnesota Golden Gophers football players
Minnesota Vikings players